Prince Constantijn of the Netherlands (Constantijn Christof Frederik Aschwin; born 11 October 1969) is the third and youngest son of the former Dutch queen, Beatrix, and her husband, Claus von Amsberg, and is the younger brother of the reigning Dutch king, Willem-Alexander. He is a member of the Dutch Royal House and currently fourth in the line of succession to the Dutch throne.

Life and career

Prince Constantijn was born on 11 October 1969 at Utrecht University Hospital (now the University Medical Center Utrecht) in Utrecht, following the births of his brothers, Willem-Alexander (born in 1967), and Johan Friso (1968–2013). He goes by the nickname Tijn. His godparents are former King Constantine II of Greece (1940-2023), Prince Aschwin of Lippe-Biesterfeld, Axel Freiherr von dem Bussche-Streithorst, Max Kohnstamm, and Corinne de Beaufort-Sickinghe.

Prince Constantijn studied law at Leiden University, becoming a lawyer, and then worked at the Brussels department of the (Dutch) European Union commissioner of foreign relations, Hans van den Broek. Later, he was hired by the EU and continued to work there in various capacities until the end of 1999. In December 2000, he was awarded a Master of Business Administration at INSEAD in Fontainebleau, France. He then spent a summer working for the International Finance Corporation of the World Bank group in Washington, DC. He worked until late 2002 for strategic consultants Booz Allen Hamilton in London. Since 2003, he works for the RAND Corporation Europe in Brussels. Furthermore, he has a part-time position at the Netherlands Ministry of Foreign Affairs in The Hague.

Prince Constantijn rarely attends public events in his capacity as a member of the Dutch Royal House. Prince Constantijn is a keen sportsman and enjoys football, tennis, golf and skiing. His other hobbies include drawing, cooking and reading.

Marriage and family
The engagement of Prince Constantijn and Petra Laurentien Brinkhorst was announced on 16 December 2000. The civil marriage was conducted by the mayor of The Hague, Wim Deetman, in the Oude Raadzaal, Javastraat, The Hague, on 17 May 2001. The church wedding took place two days later on 19 May in the Grote of St Jacobskerk, with the Reverend Carel ter Linden officiating.

Prince Constantijn and Princess Laurentien have three children: Eloise (b. 2002), Claus-Casimir (b. 2004), and Leonore (b. 2006). The family then moved from Brussels to The Hague.

Upon the abdication of Queen Beatrix on 30 April 2013, the children of Prince Constantijn and Princess Laurentien ceased to be members of the Royal House, although they continue to be members of the royal family and remain in the line of succession.

Titles, styles, honours and arms

Titles and styles
Constantijn's full title and style is: His Royal Highness Prince Constantijn Christof Frederik Aschwin of the Netherlands, Prince of Orange-Nassau, Jonkheer van Amsberg.

Honours and awards

National honours 
  : Knight Grand Cross of the Order of the Netherlands Lion
  : Knight of the Order of the Gold Lion of the House of Nassau (by birth)
 : Queen Beatrix Investiture Medal (30 April 1980)
 : Royal Wedding Medal 2002 (2 February 2002)
 : King Willem-Alexander Investiture Medal (30 April 2013)

Foreign honours 
  : Grand Cross of the Order of the Crown (20 June 2006)
  : Grand Cordon of the Supreme Order of the Renaissance (30 October 2006)
  /  : Knight of the Order of the Gold Lion of the House of Nassau (by birth)

Arms

Ancestry

References

External links
Official page created by the Dutch Royal House (English version)

1969 births
Living people
House of Orange-Nassau
INSEAD alumni
Dutch people of German descent
Grand Crosses of the Order of the Crown (Belgium)
Princes of Orange-Nassau
Amsberg
Jonkheers of Amsberg
Sons of monarchs